Love Songs (French:L'amour chante) is a 1930 French-German musical film directed by Robert Florey and starring Yolande Laffon, Piere Bertin and Janine Merrey. A separate German-language film Rendezvous and a Spanish version My Wife's Teacher were also released.

The film's sets were designed by the art directors Marc Allégret and Julius von Borsody.

Cast
 Yolande Laffon as Madame Lherminois  
 Pierre Bertin as Claude Merlerault  
 Janine Merrey as Loulou, Darling  
 Louis Baron fils as Monsieur Lherminois 
 Saturnin Fabre as M, Crispin  
 Fernand Gravey as Armand Petitjean  
 Josseline Gaël as Simone Crespin  
 Maryanne as Une mère d'élève  
 Renée Montel
 Nicole de Rouves
 Marcelle Monthil as Mlle. Bouclier  
 Michéle 
 Jim Gérald 
 Henri Lesieur
 Florelle

References

Bibliography 
 Powrie, Phil & Rebillard, Éric. Pierre Batcheff and stardom in 1920s French cinema. Edinburgh University Press, 2009.

External links 
 

1930 films
German musical films
1930 musical films
French musical films
1930s French-language films
Films directed by Robert Florey
German films based on plays
French films based on plays
French multilingual films
French black-and-white films
1930 multilingual films
Films scored by Eduard Künneke
Films with screenplays by Robert Florey
1930s French films
1930s German films